Stathelle Church is a parish church of the Church of Norway in Bamble Municipality in Vestfold og Telemark county, Norway. It is located in the town of Stathelle. It is the church for the Stathelle parish which is part of the Bamble prosti (deanery) in the Diocese of Agder og Telemark. The white and gray, brick church was built in a rectangular design in 1964 using plans drawn up by the architect Bjørn Ljungberg. The church seats about 260 people.

History
In the 1960s, work began towards building an annex chapel in Stathelle. It was designed by Bjørn Ljungberg. It is a brick building that is partly clad with wood. The nave and chancel are in the same room, giving it a rectangular design. There is a church hall in the room next to the main room too. There is a church porch at the main entrance, there is a second floor seating gallery above the porch, and a bell tower about that. The new church was consecrated by the bishop on 7 May 1964. The church was originally called a chapel, but in the 1990s, the church was made a full parish church and renamed as a church. The building was enlarged in 1988 and again in 2011.

Media gallery

See also
List of churches in Agder og Telemark

References

Bamble
Churches in Vestfold og Telemark
Rectangular churches in Norway
Brick churches in Norway
20th-century Church of Norway church buildings
Churches completed in 1964
1964 establishments in Norway